Big Pine Creek is an  river in Texas.  It is a tributary of the Red River, part of the Mississippi River watershed. The creek flows entirely within Red River County, Texas.

See also
List of rivers of Texas

References

USGS Hydrologic Unit Map - State of Texas (1974)

Rivers of Texas
Tributaries of the Red River of the South
Rivers of Red River County, Texas